Mirrors is a 2008 American supernatural horror film directed by Alexandre Aja, starring Kiefer Sutherland, Paula Patton, and Amy Smart. The film was first titled Into the Mirror, but the name was later changed to Mirrors. Filming began on May 1, 2007, and it was released in American theaters on August 15, 2008.

The film was originally scripted as a straightforward remake of the 2003 South Korean horror film Into the Mirror which is rated 15 by KMRB. However, once Aja was brought on board and read the script, he was dissatisfied with the particulars of the original film's story. He decided to retain the original film's basic idea involving mirrors, and to incorporate a few of its scenes, but otherwise crafted a new story and script for his version of the movie. A sequel titled Mirrors 2 was released in 2010.

Plot 
A security guard runs through a subway station until he enters a room he cannot escape and starts begging his reflection in a mirror for his life. His reflection uses a shard to slice into its own throat; the wound reflects upon the real security guard's body, killing him.

Ben Carson, a suspended police detective, begins his first day as a night security guard at the Mayflower, a luxury department store gutted by a fire and shuttered five years prior. The building still contains numerous mirrors from the store.

On Ben's first night of patrol, he finds a mirror that appears covered with handprints, but only on the reflected side of the glass. He sees an open door in the reflection while it is actually closed. Over time, Ben begins to see more intense visions, which he initially shrugs off as hallucinations. He soon finds the wallet of Gary Lewis, the previous night guard (from the beginning of the film) who supposedly killed himself. Inside is a note that says "Esseker". After noticing the absence of blood on the mirror shard in Gary's crime photos, Ben is convinced that the mirrors make people do things to themselves that they are not actually doing.

Meanwhile, Ben's sister, Angie, is killed by her reflection as it grips its jaw and slowly pulls its mouth apart, causing her to bleed profusely. Ben is distraught when he finds her body. In anger, he attempts to destroy the mirrors at the Mayflower, but they are impervious to damage. He demands to know what the mirrors want, and cracks appear on one of the mirrors, spelling out the word "ESSEKER".

Ben enters the flooded basement of the Mayflower and finds a small sign stating "Psychiatric Studies" and "St. Matthew's Hospital" underneath. He moves to the site of the leak and begins pulling at the tiles and brick of the wall and finds a room with a chair surrounded by mirrors beyond it, a Psychomanteum. Realizing that the Mayflower was built on the site of an earlier hospital,
Ben asks his police friend Larry Byrne to help him locate the patient-employee manifest for the hospital. Larry finds the name Anna Esseker, a patient of the psychiatric hospital. She was twelve years old at the time and died in a mass suicide.

Ben looks through Anna's file and finds an Authorization and Consent form that negated her Death Certificate, stating that she had been discharged from the hospital two days before the suicide and is led to believe that Anna is still alive. Meanwhile, Ben's wife Amy discovers her son Michael's reflection acting differently from the real Michael. In a panic, she calls Ben, who immediately returns home. Together they cover every reflective surface in the house with green paint.

Ben locates Anna Esseker's childhood home, and discovers that as a child she was violent and uncontrollable, and diagnosed with severe schizophrenia. She was taken in by a doctor, Dr. Kane from St. Matthew's Hospital, who believed that she had a rare personality disorder. His treatment was to confine Anna to a chair surrounded by mirrors, believing this would cure her disorder by forcing her to confront her own reflection. Ben is told by Anna's brother Robert that when she returned, apparently cured, strange things started to happen with the mirrors in their home. As a result, her family sent her to a convent, Saint Augustine's Monastery, where mirrors are forbidden.

Ben visits the convent and finds Anna alive and well, who explains that she was actually possessed by a demon, which was drawn from her and became trapped in the mirrors. She explains that it collects the souls of those it kills and if she were to return, it would make it possible for the demon to be brought back into the mortal world. She refuses to go back.

Meanwhile, Amy discovers that Mikey is missing at home, and a thin reflective layer of water is completely covering the floor. After putting her daughter Daisy in a safe closet, she finds Michael using a knife to scrape the paint from the mirrors. Amy tries to stop him, but he escapes, obviously possessed.

Having threatened her at gunpoint, Ben returns with Anna to the Mayflower and straps her into the chair in the Psychomanteum. Back at Ben's house Michael is suddenly pulled through the water on the floor by his reflection and begins to drown. At the Psychomanteum the lights begin to flicker and the building begins to shake as the demons in the mirrors are released. They repossess Anna and all the mirrors in the Mayflower explode. Simultaneously, Michael is released from the demon's grip and Amy is able to pull him to safety. The repossessed Anna then attacks Ben. He manages to kill her by igniting a nearby gas line, setting off a huge explosion. The old building starts to collapse violently, and Ben is trapped under the ceiling while trying to escape.

Ben pulls himself out of the rubble and stumbles out of the building. Policemen and firemen are everywhere in the street, and a body is seen being taken in a bag by paramedics, but nobody notices Ben. He looks at the older security guard's name tag and sees it is written backward, realizing everything is in reverse (like in a mirror). He comes upon a mirrored surface in the city and fails to see his own reflection as he reaches out to touch it. He realizes that he died in the rubble and is trapped in the mirror world: his hand appears as a handprint on the glass surface in the living world.

Cast

Production 
The movie began development in 2005 under the working title Into the Mirror with music video director Sanji Senaka in talks to direct the movie. The screenplay was initially written by Joe Gangemi and Jim Uhls, with rewrites by Michele and Kieran Mulroney. After Alexandre Aja signed on to direct, he brought on his partner Grégory Levasseur to completely rework the script. Filming began in fall of 2006 and was filmed mostly in the Romanian Academy of Sciences building in Bucharest.

Music 

Javier Navarrete used a prior existing work of classical music, "Asturias" by Isaac Albéniz, as the film's main theme.

Reception

Box office 
In the United States, Mirrors opened in fourth position making $11.1 million. On its second weekend, it ranked at seventh position, making a further $5 million. The film made a total of $30 million in the United States. In foreign cinemas the film stayed in the top five for its opening weekend in several countries including France, Mexico and United Kingdom, where it consistently ranked #2. It topped in the Hong Kong box office with $228,481 and stayed at the third place in Philippines and Spain. In South Korea and Russia it took #4 at the box office in its opening weekend. The film grossed $72,436,439 worldwide, including $41,745,000 from foreign cinemas.

Critical response 
Review aggregator Rotten Tomatoes reported that 14% of critics gave the film positive reviews based on 87 reviews. The site's critical consensus reads "Inconsistency and listless plot make this horror remake a less-than-frightening time at the movies." Metacritic reported the film had an average score of 35 out of 100, based on 13 reviews.

Sequel 

On October 8, 2009, the director Victor Garcia announced that he would begin to shoot a sequel, which would be released direct-to-DVD by 20th Century Fox. The sequel was released on October 19, 2010.

References

External links 
 
 
 
 
 

2000s American films
2000s English-language films
2000s German films
2000s psychological thriller films
2000s supernatural horror films
2000s supernatural thriller films
2008 horror films
2008 thriller films
20th Century Fox films
American ghost films
American psychological thriller films
American remakes of South Korean films
American supernatural horror films
American supernatural thriller films
Demons in film
English-language Romanian films
German ghost films
German psychological thriller films
German supernatural horror films
Films about dissociative identity disorder
Films about mass murder
Films about psychiatry
Films about schizophrenia
Films about suicide
Films directed by Alexandre Aja
Films scored by Javier Navarrete
Films set in abandoned buildings and structures
Films set in New York City
Films set in Pennsylvania
Films set in psychiatric hospitals
Films set in shopping malls
Films set in the 2000s
Films shot in Bucharest
Films shot in New York City
Horror film remakes
Regency Enterprises films
Romanian supernatural horror films